The 1989 Skate America was held at Market Square Arena in Indianapolis, Indiana. Medals were awarded in the disciplines of men's singles, ladies' singles, pair skating, and ice dancing.

Results

Men

Ladies

Pairs

Ice dancing

External links
 Skate Canada results

Skate America, 1989
Skate America